Rhomphaea is a genus of comb-footed spiders that was first described by Ludwig Carl Christian Koch in 1872.

Species
 it contains thirty-three species, found worldwide:

Rhomphaea aculeata Thorell, 1898 – Myanmar
Rhomphaea affinis Lessert, 1936 – Mozambique
Rhomphaea altissima Mello-Leitão, 1941 – Brazil
Rhomphaea angulipalpis Thorell, 1877 – Indonesia (Sulawesi)
Rhomphaea annulipedis Yoshida & Nojima, 2010 – Japan
Rhomphaea barycephala (Roberts, 1983) – Seychelles (Aldabra)
Rhomphaea brasiliensis Mello-Leitão, 1920 – Venezuela, Brazil
Rhomphaea ceraosus (Zhu & Song, 1991) – China
Rhomphaea cometes L. Koch, 1872 (type) – New Guinea, Samoa, French Polynesia
Rhomphaea cona (González & Carmen, 1996) – Argentina
Rhomphaea fictilium (Hentz, 1850) – Canada to Argentina
Rhomphaea hyrcana (Logunov & Marusik, 1990) – Georgia, Azerbaijan, China, Japan, Turkey?
Rhomphaea irrorata Thorell, 1898 – Myanmar
Rhomphaea labiata (Zhu & Song, 1991) – India, China, Korea, Laos, Japan
Rhomphaea lactifera Simon, 1909 – Vietnam
Rhomphaea longicaudata O. Pickard-Cambridge, 1872 – Greece, Lebanon
Rhomphaea metaltissima Soares & Camargo, 1948 – Panama to Brazil
Rhomphaea nasica (Simon, 1873) – Canary Is., Portugal, Spain, France, Italy, Croatia, Greece, Africa, St. Helena
Rhomphaea oris (González & Carmen, 1996) – Argentina
Rhomphaea ornatissima Dyal, 1935 – Pakistan
Rhomphaea palmarensis (González & Carmen, 1996) – Argentina
Rhomphaea paradoxa (Taczanowski, 1873) – St. Vincent, Mexico to Brazil
Rhomphaea pignalitoensis (González & Carmen, 1996) – Argentina
Rhomphaea procera (O. Pickard-Cambridge, 1898) – Costa Rica to Argentina
Rhomphaea projiciens O. Pickard-Cambridge, 1896 – USA to Argentina. Introduced to India
Rhomphaea recurvata (Saaristo, 1978) – Seychelles
Rhomphaea rostrata (Simon, 1873) – Canary Is., Portugal, Spain, France, Italy, Bosnia and Herzegovina, Croatia, Greece
Rhomphaea sagana (Dönitz & Strand, 1906) – Azerbaijan, Russia (Far East), Japan, Philippines
Rhomphaea sinica (Zhu & Song, 1991) – China
Rhomphaea sjostedti Tullgren, 1910 – Tanzania
Rhomphaea tanikawai Yoshida, 2001 – China, Japan
Rhomphaea urquharti (Bryant, 1933) – New Zealand
Rhomphaea velhaensis (González & Carmen, 1996) – Brazil

In synonymy:
R. argenteola (Simon, 1873) = Rhomphaea nasica (Simon, 1873)
R. canariensis (Schmidt, 1956) = Rhomphaea rostrata (Simon, 1873)
R. delicatula (Simon, 1883) = Rhomphaea nasica (Simon, 1873)
R. feioi (Mello-Leitão, 1947) = Rhomphaea projiciens O. Pickard-Cambridge, 1896
R. honesta (Exline & Levi, 1962) = Rhomphaea brasiliensis Mello-Leitão, 1920
R. longa (Kulczyński, 1905) = Rhomphaea rostrata (Simon, 1873)
R. martinae (Exline, 1950) = Rhomphaea projiciens O. Pickard-Cambridge, 1896
R. petrunkevitchi (Mello-Leitão, 1945) = Rhomphaea paradoxa (Taczanowski, 1873)
R. remota (Bryant, 1940) = Rhomphaea fictilium (Hentz, 1850)
R. simoni (Petrunkevitch, 1911) = Rhomphaea procera (O. Pickard-Cambridge, 1898)
R. spinicaudata (Keyserling, 1884) = Rhomphaea paradoxa (Taczanowski, 1873)
R. spinosa (Badcock, 1932) = Rhomphaea projiciens O. Pickard-Cambridge, 1896

See also
 List of Theridiidae species

References

Further reading

Araneomorphae genera
Cosmopolitan spiders
Taxa named by Carl Ludwig Koch
Theridiidae